The 2020 Royal Truck & Trailer 200 was the 15th stock car race of the 2020 ARCA Menards Series and the fourth race of the 2020 ARCA Menards Series East. The race was held on Saturday, September 12, 2020, in Toledo, Ohio, at Toledo Speedway, a 0.5 miles (0.80 km) permanent oval-shaped racetrack. The race took the scheduled 200 laps to complete. At race's end, Sam Mayer of GMS Racing would dominate to win his fourth career ARCA Menards Series win, his seventh career ARCA Menards Series East win, his fourth win of the season in the ARCA Menards Series, and his third win of the season in the ARCA Menards Series East. To fill out the podium, Chandler Smith of Venturini Motorsports and Ty Gibbs of Joe Gibbs Racing would finish second and third, respectively.

Background 
Toledo Speedway opened in 1960 and was paved in 1964. In 1978 it was sold to Thomas "Sonny" Adams Sr. The speedway was reacquired by ARCA in 1999. The track also features the weekly racing divisions of sportsman on the half-mile and Figure 8, factory stock, and four cylinders on a quarter-mile track inside the big track. They also have a series of races with outlaw-bodied late models that includes four 100-lap races and ends with Glass City 200. The track hosts the “Fastest short track show in the world” which features winged sprints and winged Super Modifieds on the half mile. Toledo also used to host a 200-lap late model race until its sale to ARCA in 1999.

Toledo is known for the foam blocks that line the race track, different than the concrete walls that line many short tracks throughout America. The crumbling walls can make track cleanup a tedious task for workers.

Entry list

Practice 
The only 45-minute practice session was held on Saturday, September 12.

Qualifying 
Qualifying was held on Saturday, September 12, at 3:30 PM EST. Each driver would have two laps to set a fastest time; the fastest of the two would count as their official qualifying lap.

Full qualifying results

Race results

References 

2020 ARCA Menards Series
September 2020 sports events in the United States
2020 in sports in Ohio
2020 ARCA Menards Series East